Chloe Brennan may refer to:

 Chloe Brennan (One Life to Live)
 Chloe Brennan (Neighbours)